The Kalev Infantry Battalion is an infantry battalion of the Estonian Land Forces. It is a part of the 1st Infantry Brigade and its primary task is to train conscription-based mechanized infantry units. The battalion has been previously known as the Kalevlaste Maleva and as the Kalev Single Infantry Battalion. The battalion is currently based at Jõhvi.

History

1918–1940
Formed as Kalevlaste Malev in the beginning of the Estonian War of Independence on 20 December 1918, the battalion was named after the multi-sport club Kalev, whose members founded the unit. The battalion fought in the Estonian War of Independence on the Eastern front against Soviet Russia and in Latvia against the Baltische Landeswehr. After the war, Kalevlaste Malev was moved to Võru in 1920.

Kalevlaste Malev continued to operate training conscripts and guarding the border. On 1 July 1922, Kalevlaste Maleva was officially renamed Kalev Battalion and added to the 10th Infantry Regiment. On 28 October 1928, 10th Infantry Regiment was disbanded and Kalev Battalion was renamed Kalev Single Infantry Battalion, and moved to Tallinn. After the Soviet occupation in 1940, the battalion was disbanded.

1992–present
Kalev Single Infantry Battalion was restored on 18 March 1992, and was initially based at Kose, but moved to Jägala Army Base in the summer. The battalion was equipped with BTR-80 armoured personnel carriers and BRDM-2 armoured scout cars. In 2002, the battalion was disbanded as a part of the reforms in the Estonian Defence Forces. Majority of the troops and armoured vehicles were transferred to the Scouts Battalion at Paldiski.

On 1 January 2009, Kalev Infantry Battalion was restored again as a part of the 1st Infantry Brigade at Paldiski. The battalion was equipped with Sisu XA-180 armoured personnel carriers and participates in training professional soldiers for international missions and conscripts for mechanized infantry reserve units.

The battalion relocated to Jõhvi on 1 June 2020 where they now share the army base with Viru Infantry Battalion.

Current structure
Kalev Infantry Battalion:

 Battalion Headquarters
 Infantry Company
 Combat Service Support Company
 Staff and Support Company

List of commanders
Leopold Tõnson 1918–1919
Otto Tief 1919–1920
Oskar Luiga 1920–1921
Friedrich Karl Pinka 1921–1925
Anders Linquist 1925–1928
Jakob Vende 1928–1934
Johannes Uuskam 1934–1936
Olav Mullas 1936–1937
Vassili Külaots 1937–1940
Albert Helme 1992–1993
Alar Laneman 1993–1994
 1994–1995
Margus Lillemägi 1995–1996
Artur Tiganik 1996–2000
Sander Keskküla 2000
Raul Tõnnov 2000–2001
Margus Koplimägi 2009–2012
Hannes Alesmaa 2012–2015
Mait Müürisepp 2015–2019
Ain Tiidrus 2019–2022
Argo Sibul 2022-present

See also
1st Infantry Brigade

References

External links
Official website

Battalions of Estonia
Military units and formations established in 1918
1918 establishments in Estonia
Military units and formations established in 1992
1992 establishments in Estonia